Non Stop Rock'n Roll is the third studio album by Norwegian glam metal band Wig Wam. It was released on 21 January 2010, making it the first Wig Wam album to be released worldwide on the same day.

Writing and recording 
The whole album was recorded, mastered and mixed at Wig Wam's personal studio in Halden, Norway. Wig Wam's guitarist Trond Holter produced the whole record.

Release and promotion 
On 25 February 2010 the band began filming the video for the lead single "Do You Wanna Taste It". It was the first Wig Wam single to not be released in CD format. The video was released by Frontier Records on their official YouTube channel on 9 March 2010.

Reception 

Upon its release, Non Stop Rock'n Roll, overall received positive reviews from critics.

Track listing

Personnel 
Wig Wam
Glam (Åge Sten Nilsen) – vocals
Teeny (Trond Holter) – guitars, producer, engineer, mixing
Flash (Bernt Jansen) – bass
Sporty (Øystein Andersen) – drums

 Production
Remo G Munkeboe – assistant engineer
Bjørn Engelmann – mastering

Charts

Album

Singles

In other media 
A shortened version of the track "Do You Wanna Taste It" is used as the opening credits song for the title sequence of the 2022 DC Extended Universe HBO Max series Peacemaker. The sequence features the entire cast performing a dance choreographed by Charissa-Lee Barton with stoic expressions on their faces. The title sequence was widely praised, and it led to Wig Wam, who were dropped by their booking agency shortly before it was released, to experience a career resurgence.

Release history

References 

2010 albums
Wig Wam albums
Frontiers Records albums